Maurice McCrae Blackburn (19 November 1880 – 31 March 1944) was an Australian politician and socialist lawyer, noted for his protection of the interests of workers and the establishment of the legal firm known as Maurice Blackburn Lawyers.

Biography
Blackburn was born in Inglewood, Victoria, to Maurice Blackburn, a bank manager, and his wife Thomasann Cole (née McCrae), daughter of Captain Alexander McCrae.

Following the death of his father in 1887, Blackburn and his mother moved to Melbourne where he was educated at Melbourne Grammar School, matriculating in 1896. He attended the University of Melbourne, graduating in arts and law in 1909, and began to practise as a lawyer a year later. In the same year, he also became a member of the Victorian Socialist Party and was soon editing its newspaper, The Socialist. Later, in about 1908, he joined the Australian Labor Party.

Blackburn married Doris Amelia Hordern on 10 December 1914. Two weeks earlier he had entered the Victorian Legislative Assembly as the Labor member for the Electoral district of Essendon, but lost his seat in 1917, due largely to his strong anti-war and anti-conscription stances. 

He returned to practising law, establishing the firm Maurice Blackburn & Co. in 1919, dealing primarily in trade union law and civil liberties cases.

During his time practising law, Blackburn won cases that played a key role in establishing rights most Australians now take for granted, including the 40-hour working week, wage equality for indigenous workers, and equal pay for women.

Blackburn made his mark on Australian politics in 1921 when he led a successful move to have the socialisation of the means of production added to Labor's official platform (which became known as the "socialist objective"). Returning to state Parliament as the member for Fitzroy in a 1925 by-election, Blackburn introduced legislation aimed at removing discrimination against women, and opposed what he saw as repressive economic measures proposed during the depression. In 1933, he was elected Speaker of the Victorian Legislative Assembly, but resigned from the Assembly in 1934, so he could contest the Federal seat of Bourke, based on the suburbs of Brunswick and Coburg in Melbourne. Although he won Bourke and held it until 1943, his relationship with the Labor Party was chequered.

In late 1934 and early 1935, Blackburn acted as legal counsel to prevent the deportation of the noted Czech anti-Fascist Egon Kisch.

In October 1935, he voted in favour of sanctions against Italy over the Abyssinian crisis, defying his leader John Curtin.

Blackburn's support for international socialism, and his opposition to conscription, frequently caused him to take positions opposed to Labor policy and, in October 1935, he was expelled over his membership of the Movement Against War and Fascism. He was soon re-admitted to the ALP, but expelled again in 1941 for his support of the Australia-Soviet Friendship League. His expulsion was seen as a warning to other left-wing MPs that violation of party policy was not to be tolerated. Blackburn continued to serve as the member for Bourke as an independent, voting against the Labor government's conscription bill, but he lost his seat at the 1943 election to the official Labor candidate.

Blackburn died of cerebral tumour on 31 March 1944, in Prahran, Victoria, and was buried in Box Hill Cemetery, survived by his wife, two sons, a daughter, and his mother. His estate, which included a fine library, was sworn for probate at £2,552. In a eulogy, Australian Prime Minister John Curtin referred to Blackburn as "one of the great servants of the people of the Commonwealth of Australia".  His widow, Doris, won Bourke as an Independent Labour candidate at the 1946 election and spent much of her time in Parliament promoting similar policies to those that Blackburn had supported.

References

External links

Maurice Blackburn Lawyers history of Maurice Blackburn
Victorian Parliament Profile of Former Speakers: Maurice Blackburn
 

|-

1880 births
1944 deaths
Australian Anglicans
Australian Labor Party members of the Parliament of Australia
Australian socialists
Independent members of the Parliament of Australia
Spouses of Australian politicians
20th-century Australian lawyers
Victoria (Australia) state politicians
Members of the Australian House of Representatives
Members of the Australian House of Representatives for Bourke
Speakers of the Victorian Legislative Assembly
Members of the Victorian Legislative Assembly
Melbourne Law School alumni
Australian Labor Party members of the Parliament of Victoria
Burials at Box Hill Cemetery
People from Inglewood, Victoria
20th-century Australian politicians